A senatorial election was held on November 14, 1967, in the Philippines. The 1967 election for the members of the Philippine Senate were also known as the 1967 midterm election, as the date where the elected candidates take office falls halfway through President Ferdinand Marcos' four-year term. The administration Nacionalista Party won seven seats in the Philippine Senate while the Liberal Party won one seat; the Nacionalistas got the majority in the Senate after having twelve of the 24 seats in the Senate prior to the election.

Retiring incumbents

Liberal Party 
Both were originally elected under the Progressive Party banner in 1961.
 Manuel Manahan
 Raul Manglapus

Nacionalista Party 
 Lorenzo Sumulong

Mid-term vacancies 
 Gaudencio Antonino (Nacionalista), died on November 13, 1967

Results
The Nacionalista Party won seven seats, while the Liberal Party won one.

Jose Roy of the Nacionalistas garnered the highest number of votes and was the sole incumbent to defend his seat.

Five winners are neophyte senators. These are the Nacionalistas' Helena Benitez, Salvador Laurel and Leonardo Perez, the Liberals' sole winner Benigno Aquino Jr., and independent candidate Magnolia Antonino, who was the wife of Senator Gaudencio Antonino of the Nacionalistas (originally elected as a Liberal) who died on election eve. She substituted for him and won the election.

Emmanuel Pelaez returns to the Senate, this time under the banner of the Nacionalistas, after last serving in 1959.

Three Liberal senators lost their seats: Maria Kalaw Katigbak, Camilo Osias, and Soc Rodrigo.

Key:
 ‡ Seats up
 + Gained by a party from another party
 √ Held by the incumbent
 * Held by the same party with a new senator
 ^ Vacancy

Per candidate

Per party

See also
Commission on Elections
6th Congress of the Philippines

References

External links
 Official website of the Commission on Elections
 Image snapshot

1967
1967 elections in the Philippines